Giganten , also named as "Dinosaures Giganti" is a 2-player board game designed by Herbert Pinthus and first published  in 1981 by Carlit. Gameplay is inspired by another game "Stratego" and created in prehistoric setting. There were two editions. 
 Small edition, added variable terrain (land, swamp, lakes). Lakes were not terrain but obstacles. 
 Large edition: added variable board consisting of 4 parts and added 2 more dinosaurs.

The large won the Essen Feather-prize (prize for the best rules) in 1983.

Gameplay
Each player has a set of 23 saurians (dinosaurs of various kinds, pterodactyls, plesiosaurs, etc) which are stand-up cardboard pieces with plain backs, so the opponent cannot tell which piece is which. Pieces move and attack each other Stratego-fashion, with the goal being to find your opponent's eggs. Pieces have numbers to indicate their strength.

Awards
 1983 Essen Feather

References

External links
 

Board games
Biology-themed board games
Board games introduced in 1981